Diocese of Lucknow may refer to:

 Diocese of Lucknow (Church of North India)
 Roman Catholic Diocese of Lucknow